Mark Neuman (born August 12, 1959) was a Republican member of the Alaska House of Representatives, representing the 15th District from 2005 to 2020.

He served as Co-Chair of the Resources Committee, Vice-Chair of the Labor & Commerce Committee and the Rules Committee, Economic Development, Trade & Tourism Special Committee, the Cook Inlet Salmon Task Force, and the Legislative Budget & Audit Committee. He also served on the Commerce, Community & Economic Development, Corrections, Education & Early Development, and the Natural Resources Finance Subcommittee, for the 26th Legislature.

Neuman is also a designer and builder of custom fine furniture.

Personal life
Neuman has a wife, Adel, and two children, Matthew and Amanda. Neuman graduated from Rice Lake High School in 1977. He received his certification in Refrigeration, Heating, Ventilation and Air Conditioning from the Matanuska-Susitna College in 1989.

References

External links
 Alaska State House Majority Site
 Alaska State Legislature Biography
 Project Vote Smart profile
 Mark Neuman at 100 Years of Alaska's Legislature

1959 births
Living people
Republican Party members of the Alaska House of Representatives
People from Rice Lake, Wisconsin
People from Matanuska-Susitna Borough, Alaska
21st-century American politicians